NuMega Technologies, Inc. (also known as NuMega), was a software company founded in 1987 by Frank Grossman and Jim Moskun in Nashua, New Hampshire. The company developed a Kernel mode debugger, now SoftICE, for DOS and the Windows NT family.

In 1995, the company acquired the Marquis Computing, Inc. assets VB/CodeReview and VB/FailSafe, and hired its president, Hank Marquis to manage NuMega Visual Basic products.

In December 1997, the company was acquired by Compuware, when it became NuMega Labs of Compuware. Less than a year after moving to Merrimack, the development lab was effectively shut down on 11 June 2007. In June 2009, Compuware sold the former NuMega products, the intellectual property and transferred the remaining staff to a UK-based firm named Micro Focus.

Mark Russinovich, a software developer who now serves as CTO of Microsoft Azure, started his career at NuMega.

Hank Marquis, who served as a Leadership Partner at Gartner, joined Numega with the acquisition of Marquis Computing Inc.

Notable products

 SoftICE
 DriverStudio
 BoundsChecker (Automated runtime error detection)
 DevPartner Studio
 DevPartner Java Edition
 SmartCheck (Visual Basic Error Detection)
 TrueTime (Profiling)
 TrueCoverage (Code coverage)
 CodeReview (Source code based error detection)
 FailSafe (Improved Visual Basic error handling)
 DevPartner SecurityChecker
 DevPartner Fault Simulator
 CV/1 (Microsoft CodeView on a single monitor)
 Magic CV (Microsoft CodeView running in less RAM)

Notable employees
 Matt Pietrek
 Mark Russinovich

References

Software companies based in New Hampshire
Companies based in Nashua, New Hampshire
Defunct software companies of the United States
Defunct companies based in New Hampshire
Micro Focus International